Nyahururu Falls is a  waterfall on the Ewaso Ng'iro river in Central Rift Valley Kenya, a few kilometres from Lake Ol Bolossat, which drains from the Aberdare Range. In 1883 Joseph Thomson was the first European to reach Thomson Falls, and named them for his father. Thomson wrote: 
 Thomson was a Scottish geologist and naturalist who became the first European to walk from Mombasa to Lake Victoria in the early 1880s.

The falls are a major economic resource for the adjacent town of Nyahururu. Most of the revenue is received from tourists, both international and domestic, who are charged at the gate.

The falls appeared in the TV Movie The Man in the Brown Suit (1988).

Climate 
Thomson Falls generally has an oceanic climate. It has rainfall during almost all months of the year.

Location 
Thomson’s Falls is located on the Nyahururu outskirts. It is accessed by road and is 4 hours drive from Nairobi.

References 

Waterfalls of Kenya
Landforms of Rift Valley Province
Tourist attractions in Rift Valley Province
[[Category:Laikipia County]:)